Benoi Sector is an industrial area in the Western region of Singapore within Jurong Industrial Estate. West of Benoi is Gul. East of Benoi is the Jurong Bird Park. Several Shipyards and oil refineries are located in the South of Benoi.

It is bounded by Jalan Ahmad Ibrahim, Benoi Road and Pioneer Road.

Amenities & Major Landmarks
Surrounding Benoi Industrial Estate are Exxon Mobil Refinery and Keppel Shipyard

Mass Rapid Transit
EW29 Joo Koon MRT station is located at Joo Koon Circle along Benoi Road and International Road.

Places in Singapore
West Region, Singapore
Western Water Catchment